Angkor Chum District (literally "City of the Periphery" ) is a district of Siem Reap Province, in north western Cambodia. According to the 1998 census of Cambodia, it had a population of 48,476.

Administrative divisions  
Angkor Chum District a district in Siem Reap. The district has 7 communes and ? villages.

References

Districts of Cambodia
Geography of Siem Reap province